Dakuidae is a family of acoels.

Taxonomy

Genera
There are three genera recognised in the family Dakuidae:
 Daku Hooge, 2003
 Notocelis Dörjes, 1968
 Philactinoposthia Dörjes, 1968

Species
There are 22 species recognised in the family Dakuidae:

References

Acoelomorphs
Monogeneric animal families